Termessa zonophanes, the double yellow-patched footman, is a moth of the subfamily Arctiinae. The species was first described by Edward Meyrick in 1888. It is known from the Australian Capital Territory, New South Wales, Queensland and Victoria.

The larvae probably feed on lichens.

References

Lithosiini
Moths described in 1888